Sorry for Your Loss is an American drama series created by Kit Steinkellner that premiered on September 18, 2018 on Facebook Watch. The series follows a young widow and her family as they struggle to cope with the unexpected death of her husband and stars Elizabeth Olsen, Kelly Marie Tran, Jovan Adepo, Mamoudou Athie, and Janet McTeer. On December 13, 2018, it was announced that the series had been renewed for a second season, which premiered on October 1, 2019.

On January 16, 2020, Facebook Watch canceled the series after two seasons.

Premise
Sorry for Your Loss follows "Leigh Shaw, a young widow who is forced to reassess her life and relationships following the death of her husband."

Cast and characters

Main
Elizabeth Olsen as Leigh Shaw, a writer and recently-widowed woman. Following her husband's death, she quits her job writing an advice column for the website Basically News and moves in with her mother and sister. She currently works as an instructor at her mother's fitness studio, Beautiful Beast.
Kelly Marie Tran as Jules Shaw, a recovering alcoholic and Leigh's adopted sister who also works at Beautiful Beast.
Jovan Adepo as Danny Greer, Matt's brother with whom Leigh has always had an acrimonious relationship.
Mamoudou Athie as Matt Greer, a high school English teacher and Leigh's late husband who possessed aspirations of becoming a comic book artist.
Janet McTeer as Amy Shaw, Leigh and Jules' mother who owns and runs her own fitness studio, Beautiful Beast.
Zack Robidas as Drew Burmester (recurring season 1, main season 2), the editor of the website Basically News, where Leigh had her advice column, and Leigh's best friend. He waits to tell Leigh about his engagement to his boyfriend Ryan as they became engaged right after Matt died.

Recurring
Aisha Alfa as Claire, a woman who leads the grief counseling group that Leigh attends.
Lyndon Smith as Lacey, an instructor at Beautiful Beast who has a rocky relationship with Jules.
B.K. Cannon as Frankie, a close friend of Leigh's who became distant following Matt's death.
Don McManus as Richard, Jules and Leigh's father and Amy's ex-husband. He reconnects with Amy after having been divorced for over twenty years.
Carmen Cusack as Sabrina, Richard's wife with whom he has marital problems. She becomes closer with Jules as the two connect over their shared struggle with alcoholism.
Ryan Reilly as Ryan, Drew's fiancée who was caught flirting with another man via text causing a rift in their relationship. The couple became engaged following Matt's death after coming to a realization about the brevity of life.
Lauren Robertson as Becca Urwin, a new member of the grief counseling group whose husband died while serving in the US military in Afghanistan. She is new to Los Angeles and attempts to befriend Leigh after believing that they might have a lot in common but is immediately rebuffed. She and Leigh eventually connect during a visit to a spa where she reveals that she has been putting up a front in order to please other people by lying about her relationship with her late husband.
LisaGay Hamilton as Bobby Greer, Matt and Danny's mother.
Briana Venskus as Tommy, Jules's girlfriend.

Guest
Poorna Jagannathan as Matt's Psychiatrist ("17 Unheard Messages"), a psychiatrist who counsels Matt through his depression.
Vic Chao as Joe Tsang ("17 Unheard Messages"), an editor at Flatland Ave Comics, a comic book publisher who decides to publish Matt's comic.
Alexander Koch as Nicholas "The Schwab" Schwaback ("I Want a Party"), a former classmate of Leigh's from high school who had a crush on Amy.
Jack De Sena as Ryan's College Friend ("A Widow Walks Into a Wedding"), a man whom Jules flirts with at Drew and Ryan's wedding.
Daniel Vincent Gordh as Mike ("A Widow Walks Into a Wedding"), Ryan's brother.
Luke Kirby as Tripp ("Welcome to Palm Springs"), the owner of the Palms Club Hotel who has a brief fling with Leigh when she stays at the hotel.
Cleopatra Coleman as Simone ("I'm Here"), a woman Danny spends the day with.

Episodes

Series overview

Season 1 (2018)

Season 2 (2019)

Production

Development
Around 2013, playwright Kit Steinkellner initially devised the series after composing a writing sample that was inspired by a night when she had thought something terrible had happened to her husband. She proceeded to send that piece of writing to Robin Schwartz, a programming executive at the production company Big Beach, who liked Steinkellner's concept and had her draft a full script. By 2014, the production was set up at Showtime, then under the title Widow, where it languished in the development process over the ensuing years. Eventually, Big Beach was able to extract the series from the network and began to shop it to various streaming services and pay-cable television networks.

On February 9, 2018, it was announced that Facebook had given the production a straight-to-series order for a first season consisting of ten episodes. Steinkellner was set to executive produce the series alongside Schwartz, Elizabeth Olsen, Lizzy Weiss, James Ponsoldt, Marc Turtletaub and Peter Saraf, Cynthia Pett, Brad Petrigala, and Jon Liebman. Additionally, Weiss was expected to serve as the series' showrunner, Ponsoldt as the director of multiple episodes, and Avy Kaufman as the series' casting director. Production companies slated to be involved in the series included Big Beach TV, a subsidiary of independent film company Big Beach.

On March 1, 2018, it was announced that the series had been retitled Sorry for Your Loss and its central premise was revealed. On August 3, 2018, it was reported that the series would premiere on September 18, 2018. On December 13, 2018, it was announced that the series had been renewed for a second season.

Casting
Alongside the series order announcement, it was confirmed that Elizabeth Olsen had been cast in the series' lead role. On March 1, 2018, it was announced that Kelly Marie Tran had been cast in a series regular role. The following day, it was reported that Jovan Adepo had joined the main cast and that Janet McTeer and Mamoudou Athie were in talks for series regular roles. A week later, it was announced that McTeer and Athie had officially joined the cast.

Filming
Principal photography for the first season began on April 18, 2018 at CBS Studio Center in Los Angeles. On June 1, 2018, filming took place in Altadena, California. Filming occurred from June 5 to June 8, 2018 at the Parker Palm Springs hotel in Palm Springs, California.

Release

Marketing
On August 13, 2018, a series of "first-look" images from the series were released. On August 28, 2018, the official trailer for the series was released.

Premiere
The series had its world premiere at the 2018 Toronto International Film Festival in Toronto, Ontario, Canada. The first four episodes of the series were screened, followed by a Q & A with creator Kit Steinkellner, Director James Ponsoldt, and stars Lizzie Olsen and Jovan Adepo as part of the festival's Primetime series of television screenings.

Reception

Critical response
The series has been met with a positive response from critics upon its premiere. On the review aggregation website Rotten Tomatoes, the series holds a 93% approval rating, with an average rating of 7.58 out of 10 based on 30 reviews. The website's critical consensus reads, "Thoroughly honest and insightful, Sorry For Your Loss tackles a sensitive theme, but with a witty touch." Metacritic, which uses a weighted average, assigned the series a score of 83 out of 100 based on 12 critics, indicating "universal acclaim."

In a positive review, The Atlantics Sophie Gilbert offered effusive praise describing the show as the "kind of series that’s instantly so fully formed, so funny and candid and wrenching right from the start, that you almost question the emotional propriety of it all." Similarly enthusiastic, The Daily Beasts Kevin Fallon said of the series, "Sorry For Your Loss is a gem of a show. With a cast this impressive—in Olsen, an Avenger; in Tran, a Star Wars alum; in McTeer, a renowned Oscar nominee—a series this well-executed would ordinarily be a marquee entry in the fall TV season." In another favorable critique, Colliders Allison Keene commended the show saying, "Sorry for Your Loss is an intense, emotionally raw meditation on grief. And yet, it’s never overwhelming as much as engrossing." In a further approving evaluation, Salons Melanie McFarland commended the performances of the cast saying, "The feelings Olsen, Tran and the rest of the cast capture come across as true and natural, more affirming than depressing, a difficult balancing act to pull off in the most typical of dramas and in brighter months."

In a more mixed assessment, Slates Inkoo Kang criticized the series saying, "Good intentions and all-around excellent performances can't make Sorry for Your Loss add up to the sum of its parts. Its keen sensitivity points to the dearth of grounded, relatable shows about loss, but falls short of filling that gap itself." In a negative review, IndieWires Ben Travers gave the series a grade of "C−" and described it as, "little more than a meditation on death, offering a turgid reminder that the end is inescapable for us all and can be devastating for those we leave behind."

Awards and nominations

See also
 List of original programs distributed by Facebook Watch

References

External links

2010s American drama television series
2018 American television series debuts
2019 American television series endings
American drama web series
English-language television shows
Facebook Watch original programming
Television series about widowhood
Television shows filmed in Los Angeles